Klaus-Dietrich Flade (born 23 August 1952) is a German pilot and former German Aerospace Center astronaut who visited the Mir space station in 1992 aboard the Soyuz TM-14 mission, returning to Earth a week later aboard Soyuz TM-13.

Biography

Born in Büdesheim, West Germany, he joined the German Air Force after school. Educated initially as an airplane engineer, he studied aerospace engineering at Bundeswehr University Munich from 1976 to 1980. Afterwards he became a pilot. He trained as a test pilot from 1988 to 1989. In October 1990, he was selected as part of the German astronaut team for the Euromir '92 flight.

After two years of training, he flew as a research cosmonaut on Soyuz TM-14 in March 1992. After his spaceflight, he returned to the German Air Force. He is now test pilot at Airbus Industrie.

External links
Spacefacts biography of Klaus-Dietrich Flade
Profile on German Air Force website

1952 births
Living people
German astronauts
Bundeswehr University Munich alumni
German Air Force pilots
Mir crew members
Military personnel from Rhineland-Palatinate